Youth is a period of life. It is also a slang term for an adolescent, especially a boy.

Youth may also refer to:

Books
 Youth, play by Thornton Wilder
 Youth (play), 1881 melodrama by Augustus Harris
 Youth (Asimov short story), 1952 science fiction story by Isaac Asimov
 Youth (Conrad short story), 1898 short story by Joseph Conrad
 Youth (Tolstoy novel), 1856 novel by Leo Tolstoy
 Youth: Scenes from Provincial Life II, 2002 novel by J. M. Coetzee
 Youth, a poem by Samuel Ullman

Films and television series
 Youth, 1917 American film starring Carlyle Blackwell
 Youth (1922 film), German film directed by Fred Sauer
 Youth (1934 film), French film directed by Georges Lacombe
 , Chinese film directed by Xie Jin
 Youth (2002 film), Indian Tamil film starring Vijay
 Youth (2013 film), Israeli - German film by Tom Shoval
 Youth (2015 film), film by Paolo Sorrentino
 Youth (2016 film), Indian Marathi film starring Neha Mahajan
 Youth (2017 film), Chinese film directed by Feng Xiaogang
 , 2018 television series remade from South Korean television series, Hello, My Twenties!
 Youth (TV series), upcoming South Korean television series based on BTS

People
 Big Youth (born 1949), Jamaican deejay, mostly known for his work during the 1970s
 Youth (musician) (born 1960), record producer and musician in the band Killing Joke
 Todd Youth (born 1971), American guitarist

Sports
 Youth (athletics), athletics age category (under 17, but over 15)
 Youth (horse) (born 1973), American-bred French Thoroughbred racehorse

Music

Albums
 Youth (BTS album), 2016
 Youth (Collective Soul album), 2004
 Youth (Matisyahu album), 2006
 Youth (Tinie Tempah album), 2017
 Youth (Kihyun EP), 2022
 Youth (WEi EP), 2022
 Youth, 2013 album by Glen Check
 Youth, a 2022 EP by Luminous

Songs and compositions
 "Youth" (Foxes song), 2013
 "Youth" (Shawn Mendes song), 2018
 "Youth" (Troye Sivan song), 2015
 Youth (wind sextet), chamber composition by Leoš Janáček
 "Youth", song by Arnold Bax
 "Youth", song by Band-Maid on the album Unseen World
 "Youth", song by Daughter
 "Youth", song by Glass Animals on the album How to Be a Human Being
 "Youth", song by Soft Cell on the album Non-Stop Erotic Cabaret

Other uses
 Youth, Georgia, community in the United States
 Tuổi Trẻ, Vietnamese newspaper
 Youth, alternative name of The Spirit of Spanish Music, a sculpture by Burt Johnson

See also
 The Youth (disambiguation)
 Index of youth articles